The University of Hamburg (also referred to as UHH) is a public research university in Hamburg, Germany. It was founded on 28 March 1919 by combining the previous General Lecture System (Allgemeines Vorlesungswesen), the Hamburg Colonial Institute (Hamburgisches Kolonialinstitut), and the Academic College (Akademisches Gymnasium). The main campus is located in the central district of Rotherbaum, with affiliated institutes and research centres distributed around the city-state.

The university has been ranked in the top 200 universities worldwide by the Times Higher Education Ranking, the Shanghai Ranking and the CWTS Leiden Ranking, placing it among the top 1% of global universities. Seven Nobel Prize winners and one Wolf Prize winner are affiliated with UHH.

On a national scale, U.S. News & World Report ranks UHH 7th and QS World University Rankings 14th out of a total of 426 German institutions of higher education.

History

Founding

At the beginning of the 20th century, wealthy individuals made several unsuccessful petitions to the Hamburg Senate and Parliament requesting the establishment of a university. Senator Werner von Melle worked towards the merging of existing institutions into one university, but this plan failed. Much of the establishment wanted to see Hamburg limited to its role as a trading center, and were concerned about both the costs of a university and the social ambitions of professors who would be recruited by the university.

In 1907 proponents of a university founded the Hamburg Scientific Foundation (Hamburgische Wissenschaftliche Stiftung), followed by the Hamburg Colonial Institute in 1908. The Science Foundation supported the recruitment of scholars for the chairs of the General Lecture System and funding of research cruises, while the Colonial Institute was responsible for all education and research questions concerning overseas territories. In 1911 the city's first lecture building opened, later becoming the main building of the university. Plans for the foundation of the university itself were shelved due to the outbreak of the First World War.

After the war, the first freely elected senate chose von Melle as mayor. He and Rudolf Ross advocated for education reform in Hamburg, and were able to pass a law establishing both the university and an adult high school. On 28 March 1919, the University of Hamburg opened its gates, increasing the number of full professorships in Hamburg from 19 to 39. Both the Colonial Institute and the General Lecture System were absorbed into the university. The university's first Schools, or Faculties, were Law and Political Science, Medicine, Philosophy and Natural Sciences.

Weimar Republic and the National Socialist Era
During the Weimar Republic, the university quickly grew to become important. The student population reached several thousand, and the growing popularity of the university drew scholars such as Albrecht Mendelssohn Bartholdy, Aby Warburg and Ernst Cassirer to Hamburg. Many students were suffering due to the poor economic situation that prevailed in the early republic, leading to the foundation of the Hamburg Association of Student Aid in 1922. Ernst Cassirer became the principal of the university in 1929, one of the first Jewish scholars to take that role in Germany. The number of full professors had grown to 75 by 1931.

The academic situation shifted quickly after the general election in March 1933. On 1 May of that year, the university held a ceremony to honor Adolf Hitler as its leader. Massive political influence by the Nazis followed, including the removal of books from the libraries and harassment against alleged enemies of the regime. About 50 scientists, including Ernst Cassirer and William Stern, had to leave the university. At least 10 Hamburg students were suspected of working with the White Rose and arrested; four died in custody or were executed. A commemorative plate depicting the foyer of the lecture hall, designed by Fritz Fleer, was produced in 1971 in their memory.

In the Federal Republic of Germany

Once the Second World War was over, the university reopened in the winter of 1945 with 17,800 employees. Of the 2,872 students who were enrolled at the University of Hamburg in the first postwar semester of 1945/46, 601 had been admitted to the School of Philosophy, 952 to the School of Medicine, 812 to the School of Law and Political Science, and 506 to the School of Mathematics and Natural Sciences. The first student association during this period was elected in 1946 under British supervision, and it became the foundation of the General Students' Committee, AStA, in 1947.

During the West German era, new departments were added to the university. In 1954 the School of Protestant Theology was added, and the School of Law separated from the School of Economic and Social Sciences. This growth was accompanied by significant construction in the late 1950s and early 1960s. The Auditorium and the Philosopher's Tower were inaugurated near the Von-Melle-Park, while the Botanical Institute and Botanical Garden were relocated to Flottbeck. The university grew from 12,600 students in 1960 to 19,200 in 1970.

A wave of protests during the student movements of 1968 resulted in a reform of the university's structure. In 1969, the Faculties were dissolved in favor of more interdisciplinary departments. The involvement of students and staff in the administration was also increased, and the office of Rektor was abolished in favor of a university president. Parts of these reforms were rescinded in 1979 as part of the Hamburg Higher Education Act. The main campus in the Rotherbaum quarter was completed with additional construction in the 1970s, including the Geomatikum building and the Wiwi-Bunker (named for its bunker-like architecture). After this, growth focused on other parts of Hamburg. Two newly constructed buildings were opened adjacent to the Main Building in 1998 and 2002, revitalizing the Moorweide area of the university.

In 2005, the Hamburg University of Economy and Politics was merged into the University of Hamburg by a political act that was opposed by both institutions. Under the same act, the 17 departments of the two institutions were merged and restructured into six faculties. The implementation of the Bologna process, an effort to ensure comparability of standards across European institutions, was another major point of contention during that decade.

Campus
The University of Hamburg is made up of over 180 properties scattered throughout the city. The Main Building stands on the Moorweide opposite Hamburg Dammtor station, not far from the main campus at Von-Melle-Park. The State and University Library Hamburg, the Audimax (Auditorium), the Hamburg University Archive and several other teaching buildings are all located in that area. The second cluster of university buildings is grouped around Martin Luther King Square in the same quarter. The Geomatikum marks the western end of the campus, near Schlump Metro Station. Several departments are located in other quarters: Physics is spread over branches at Jungiusstraße, Bergedorf (along with the Hamburg Observatory) and Bahrenfeld (with the world-renowned DESY and other facilities). Biology has locations in Flottbeck, while Computer Sciences moved to Stellingen in 1991. The Medical School is located in the University Hospital Hamburg-Eppendorf.

Academics

As of the 2020–2021 academic year, the total student body is over 44,000, with 10,000 freshmen matriculating each year. Almost 5,500 doctoral candidates are enrolled. 149 different majors are offered by six faculties with almost 700 professors engaged in teaching and research. In addition, over 3,600 academic staff and over 7,000 administrative and technical staff members are employed by the university. The University of Hamburg supports seven Collaborative Research Centers (German: Sonderforschungsbereiche) sponsored by the German Research Foundation.

Rankings

In October 2012, the university decided not to participate in national or global rankings in the foreseeable future, due to the administrative costs required to participate. The methodologies used by many ranking systems have also been criticized. However, the University of Hamburg continues to be featured in major global rankings: 
 The Physics and Astronomy department of UHH was ranked 76th in the world in 2021 by  QS World University Subject Rankings .
 Measured by the number of top managers in the German economy, UHH ranked 15th in 2019.
The Best Global Universities Ranking of the U.S. News & World Report ranked UHH 7th nationally, 44th in Europe and 121st in the world as of 2017.
 The QS World University Rankings and Shanghai Jiao Tong University's Academic Ranking of World Universities placed UHH among the national top 15 and global top 250 universities as of 2017.
 According to the Times Higher Education Ranking 2021, UHH ranked 12th in Germany and 135th worldwide.
 UHH was ranked 6th in Germany and 186th worldwide by the 2020 CWTS Leiden Ranking.
 The 2016 Center for World Universities (CWUR) ranked UHH 9th nationally and 170th globally (out of more than 25,000 institutions).
 The Webometrics Ranking of World Universities, which classifies universities according to volume and impact of web publications, ranked UHH 5th in Germany and 140th worldwide out of roughly 12,000 universities.
 In 2016, Eduniversal ranked Universität Hamburg School of Business, Economics and Social Sciences 13th in Germany – between Technical University of Munich and Free University of Berlin.
In 2019, UHH was inducted into German Excellence Strategy of the Federal and State Governments, a competition for top-level university research funding in Germany, with four distinct clusters of Excellence. As of July 2019, UHH is one of eleven universities to be awarded the status of University of Excellence for their "Flagship University" concept.

Administrative structure
Faculty of Law
 Jurisprudence

Faculty of Business Administration
 Business Administration (BWL)

Faculty of Economics and Social Sciences
 Department of Social Economics
 Department of Social Sciences
 Department of Macroeconomics (VWL)

Faculty of Medicinal Sciences

Medical Sciences

Faculty of Education, Psychology and Human Movement
Department of Human Movement
Department of Education
Department of Psychology
Service Department for Evaluation

Faculty of Humanities
Asia – Africa Institute
Department of Theology
Department of History
Department of Cultural History and Contemporary Culture
Department of Philosophy
Department of Language, Literature, Media (SLM)

Faculty of Mathematics, Computer Science and Natural Sciences
Department of Biology
Department of Chemistry
Department of Geosciences
Department of computer science
Department of Mathematics
Department of Physics
Center for Bioinformatics
Center for Forest Products

Faculty of Engineering
Department of Mechanical Engineering

Facilities and associated institutes

The Hamburg State and University Library Carl von Ossietzky, established in 1479, contains over 5 million volumes and is the biggest academic library in the Hamburg metropolitan area. It is also used as a legal deposit and archive for the city-state. It owns a large number of special collections and items of historic value, including medieval manuscripts. Hamburg University Press is also part of the library system. All of these are located on the central campus.

A large number of Associated Institutes (An-Institute) are affiliated with the university, among them the Hans-Bredow-Institut for Media Research and the Heinrich Pette Institute – Leibniz Institute for Experimental Virology. Other affiliated institutions include:
 Hamburg Observatory
 German Climate Computing Centre
 Alfred Wegener Institute for Polar and Marine Research
 Bernhard Nocht Institute for Tropical Medicine
 European Molecular Biology Laboratory
 Max Planck Institute for Meteorology
 Confucius Institute Hamburg
 Hamburg Centre for Ultrafast Imaging
The China-EU School of Law at China University of Political Science and Law in Beijing, China, which contains 16 member institutions for providing mid-career training, master's degree and joint doctoral research in China-EU Law. UHH was one of the founding members.

University of Hamburg alumni and faculty

Students/graduates

Frank Baffoe – Ghanaian economist, diplomat and businessman
Wolfgang Burandt – Lawyer, legal academic and professor for commercial law
Gerd Bucerius – Politician, the namesake of the Bucerius Law School
Ezriel Carlebach – Israeli journalist and editorial writer
Shiing-Shen Chern – Winner of Wolf Prize in Mathematics in 1984
Jürgen Ehlers – Winner of Max Planck Medal in 2002
Juergen Fitschen – Co-CEO of Deutsche Bank from 2009 to 2016
Rainer Froese – Developer of FishBase
Klaus Hasselmann – oceanographer and climate modeller, and recipient of the Nobel Prize in Physics in 2021
Harald zur Hausen – Winner of Nobel Prize in Physiology or Medicine 2008
Ingo Heidbrink – Maritime Historian. Secretary-General of the International Commission for Maritime History
Wolfgang Hoffmann-Riem – Legal scholar and a former judge of the Federal Constitutional Court of Germany
J. Hans D. Jensen – Winner of Nobel Prize in Physics in 1963
Hein Kötz – Director of the Max-Planck-Institute for foreign and international private law (MPI-PRIV), the Bucerius Law School and Vice President of the Deutsche Forschungsgemeinschaft
Hans Adolf Krebs – Winner of Nobel Prize in Physiology or Medicine in 1953
Jens Marklof – Mathematician and physicist. Winner of the Whitehead Prize.
Emma Mbua – the first woman from East Africa to become a palaeontologist.
Reinhard Moratz – Ausserplanmässiger Professor at the University of Münster's Institute for Geoinformatics
Paul Nevermann – First Mayor of Hamburg (1961–1965)
Silke Ospelkaus – Group leader at the Max Planck Institute of Quantum Optics
Jože Pučnik – Known as one of the "Fathers of Slovenian independence from Yugoslavia"
Dagmar Reichardt – Cultural scholar
Joachim Ritter – philosopher and founder of the so-called Ritter School of liberal conservatism
Waldemar R. Röhrbein, historian, director of Historisches Museum Hannover
Peter Schlechtriem – Law scholar
Wolfgang Schäuble – Germany's Federal Minister of Finance in the second and third Merkel cabinets since 2009
Helmut Schmidt – Graduate, Economist, Chancellor of West Germany from 1974 to 1982
Olaf Scholz – Lawyer, Chancellor of Germany since 2021.
Klaus-Peter Siegloch – Former journalist and reporter for ZDF
Peter Sloterdijk – Philosopher and cultural theorist
Richard Sorge – Famous spy
Leo Strauss – Political philosopher well known for US esotericism
Ole Wittmann – German art historian, curator, and publisher
Jan Kohlhaase – Mathematician

Faculty

Helmut Bley (born 1935), German historian, academic councillor, supervising students from the Third World 
Ernst Cassirer – Neo-Kantian Philosopher and Historian, a professor from 1919 to 1933
Henry N. Chapman – X-ray physicist and crystallographer, winner of the Leibniz Prize in 2015.
Emil Artin – Mathematician, a professor from 1923 to 1937
Curt Kosswig – Zoologist who worked for many years in Turkey before spending 1955–1969 at Hamburg University
Georg von Dadelsen – Musicologist, 1960 to 1971, Neue Bach-Ausgabe
Rudolf Fleischmann – Experimental nuclear physicist
Otto Franke – first Sinology Chair at Hamburg
Wolfgang Franke – Sinology Chair, son of Otto
Klaus Hasselmann – oceanographer and climate modeller, and recipient of the Nobel Prize in Physics 2021
Wilhelm Lenz – Physicist, advisor of J. Hans D. Jensen
Willibald Jentschke – Experimental nuclear physicist
Klaus Koch – Expert in the growth of Biblical Studies
Arnold Kohlschütter – Well-known astronomer and astrophysicist
Yu-chien Kuan – Chinese defector, Sinologist, and writer
Agathe Lasch – First female professor at Hamburg (1917–1934), Germanic philologist and Holocaust victim
Wolfgang Paul – Winner of Nobel Prize in Physics in 1989, founder of the DESY.
Wolfgang Pauli – Winner of Nobel Prize in Physics in 1945
Johann Radon – Mathematician
W. G. Sebald – Literary critic and writer
Otto Stern – Winner of Nobel Prize in Physics in 1943
William Stern – Inventor of the concept of the intelligence quotient (IQ)
Jakob Johann von Uexküll – Founder of biosemiotics
Alfred Wegener – Founder of the continental drift theory
Carl Friedrich von Weizsäcker – Nuclear physicist known as the longest-living member of the research team that performed nuclear research in Germany during the Second World War

See also
 Education in Hamburg
 Hamburg University of Technology
 List of forestry universities and colleges
 List of modern universities in Europe (1801–1945)
 List of universities in Germany

References

External links

  
 University History 
 

 
1919 establishments in Germany
Educational institutions established in 1919
Universities and colleges in Hamburg